In journalism, mainstream media (MSM) is a term and abbreviation used to refer collectively to the various large mass news media that influence many people and both reflect and shape prevailing currents of thought. The term is used to contrast with alternative media.
 
The term is often used for large news conglomerates, including newspapers and broadcast media, that underwent successive mergers in many countries. The concentration of media ownership has raised concerns of a homogenization of viewpoints presented to news consumers. Consequently, the term mainstream media has been used in conversation and the blogosphere, sometimes in oppositional, pejorative or dismissive senses, in discussion of the mass media and media bias.

United States

In the United States, movie production is known to have been dominated by major studios since the early 20th century; before that, there was a period in which Edison's Trust monopolized the industry. In the early 21st century, the music and television industries was subject to media consolidation, with Sony Music Entertainment's parent company merging their music division with Bertelsmann AG's BMG to form Sony BMG, and Warner Bros. Entertainment's The WB and CBS Corp.'s UPN merging to form The CW. In the case of Sony BMG there existed a "Big Five", later "Big Four", of major record companies, while The CW's creation was an attempt to consolidate ratings and stand up to the "Big Four" of American network (terrestrial) television (although the CW was actually partially owned by one of the Big Four in CBS). In television, the vast majority of broadcast and basic cable networks, over a hundred in all, are controlled by eight corporations: Fox Corporation, The Walt Disney Company (which includes the ABC, ESPN, FX and Disney brands), National Amusements (which owns Paramount Global), Comcast (which owns NBCUniversal), Warner Bros. Discovery, E. W. Scripps Company, Altice USA, or some combination thereof.

Media mergers and concentration in the United States 
Over time the rate of media mergers has increased, while the number of media outlets has also increased. This has resulted in a higher concentration of media ownership, with fewer companies owning more media outlets.

Some critics, such as Ben Bagdikian, assailed concentration of ownership, arguing that large media acquisitions limit the information accessible to the public. Other commentators, such as Ben Compaine and Jack Shafer, find Bagdikian's critique overblown. Shafer noted that U.S. media consumers have a wide variety of news sources, including independent national and local sources. Compaine argues that, based on economic metrics such as the Herfindahl-Hirschman Index, the media industry is not very highly concentrated and did not become more concentrated during the 1990s and 2000s. Compaine also points out that most media mergers are not purely acquisitions, but also include divestitures.

The "Big five"

American public distrust in the media
Trust in the media declined in the 1970s, and then again in the 2000s. Since the 2000s, distrust in the media has been polarized, as Republicans have grown substantially more distrustful of the media than Democrats.

United Kingdom  
In the UK, during 1922, after the closure of many radio stations, the British Broadcasting Corporation started its first daily radio transmission and started to grow an audience. Later that year John Reith, a Scottish engineer, would be appointed the first General Manager for the BBC. Later on January 1, 1927 the BBC was fully established by Royal Charter and renamed the British Broadcasting Corporation with Reith as the first Director-General. During November 1936 the BBC began to expand into television broadcasting and was the first broadcaster to start the trend of a regularly scheduled TV service.

Today the BBC is one of two chartered public broadcasting companies in the United Kingdom. The second is ITV, Independent Television, which was established in 1955 as the first public commercial television company after the Television act of 1954 in an effort to break up the monopoly the BBC had on television broadcasting, gaining fifteen regional broadcasting licenses in less than twenty years. Today the BBC and ITV are the two free to air digital services offered to everyone in the United Kingdom and each other's biggest competitors. The BBC has nine national television channels, BBC three, the first channel to switch from television to online, an interactive channel, ten national and forty local radio stations, BBC Online, and BBC Worldwide. ITV currently holds thirteen of the fifteen regional broadcasting licenses in the United Kingdom that carries their multiple channels including ITV, ITVhub, ITV2, ITVBe, ITV 3, ITV4, CITV, ITV Encore, 
Britbox, a video-on-demand service in collaboration with the BBC to bring British television content to the United States and Canada, and Cirkus, their own video-on-demand service.

See also

 Agenda-setting theory
 Alternative media
 Big Three television networks
 Concentration of media ownership
 Deregulation
 Fake news
 Freedom of speech
 Freedom of the press
 Influence of mass media
 Lists of corporate assets
 Local News Service
 Media bias
 Media conglomerate
 Media cross-ownership in the United States
 Media democracy
 Media imperialism
 Media manipulation
 Media proprietor
 Media transparency
 Monopolies of knowledge
 Network neutrality
 New media
 Old media
 Partido da Imprensa Golpista
 Politico-media complex
 Prometheus Radio Project
 Propaganda model
 Sensationalism
 Social influence
 Social media
 State controlled media
 Telecommunications Act of 1996
 Viral phenomenon
 Western media

Notes

Concentration of media ownership
New media
News media
Mass media events
Mass media issues

Social influence